Pedro Manuel de Ataíde (1665 – 19 September 1722) was a Portuguese nobleman. He was the 5th Count of Atalaia between 1706 and his death.

Life 
He was the son of Luís Manuel de Távora, 4th Count of Atalaia and Maria Madalena de Noronha de Sousa, daughter of the 1st Marquis of Minas.

In 1694, together with his cousin João de Sousa, 3rd Marquis of Minas, he had a conflict with the Corregedor of Bairro Alto, which resulted in the death of the Corregedor. Both young men fled to France, where they came under the protection of François de Neufville, duc de Villeroi and fought in his army.

After being pardoned by king Peter II of Portugal in 1704, he returned to his home country and served under his father and uncle, supreme commander António Luís de Sousa, 2nd Marquis of Minas, in the War of the Spanish Succession. He participated in the Portuguese occupation of Madrid in 1706 and the following retreat to Catalonia. He distinguished himself in the Battle of Almansa where he commanded the right wing. With his father killed and his uncle recalled to Lisbon, he became the commander of the Portuguese forces in Catalonia.

He commanded Portuguese and allied forces in the Battle of Zaragoza and the Battle of Villaviciosa.

After the allied defeat in 1713, he accompanied Charles III to Vienna.  Here he became Grandee of Spain, and was made Viceroy of Sardinia, General of the Cavalry in Naples and Governor of Castelnuovo.

1665 births
1722 deaths
Portuguese generals
Portuguese army commanders in the War of the Spanish Succession
Portuguese nobility
17th-century Portuguese people
18th-century Portuguese people
Grandees of Spain
Viceroys of Sardinia
People from Viana do Castelo